Macaria sulphurea is a species of geometrid moth in the family Geometridae. It is found in North America. This species was formerly in the genus Speranza.

The MONA or Hodges number for Macaria sulphurea is 6283.

References

External links

 

Macariini
Articles created by Qbugbot
Moths described in 1873